Martensia is a genus of red algae, containing the following species:

The genus name of Martensia is in honour of George Matthias von Martens (1788–1872), who was a German lawyer, botanist and phycologist.

The genus was circumscribed by Constantin Hering in Ann. Mag. Nat. Hist. vol.8 on page 92 in 1841.

Species

Martensia albida Y.Lee, 2006
Martensia australis Harvey, 1855
Martensia bibarii Y.Lee, 2004
Martensia denticulata Harvey, 1855
Martensia elegans Hering, 1841
Martensia flabelliformis Harvey ex J.Agardh, 1863
Martensia flammifolia Y.Lee, 2006
Martensia formosana S.-M.Lin, Hommersand & Fredericq, 2004
Martensia fragilis Harvey, 1854
Martensia indica V.Krishnamurthy & Thomas, 1977
Martensia jejuensis Y.Lee, 2004
Martensia lewisiae S.-M.Lin, Hommersand & Fredericq, 2004
Martensia martensii (F.Schmitz) S.-M.Lin, Fredericq & L.M.Liao, 2001
Martensia natalensis S.-M.Lin, Hommersand, Fredericq & De Clerck, 2009
Martensia palmata Y.Lee, 2005
Martensia projecta Y.Lee, 2005

References

Red algae genera
Delesseriaceae